Lovense is a Hong Kong-based sex tech company specializing in the development of remotely controlled sex toys and pleasure products, as well as accompanying software.

History
Lovense was founded by Dan Liu in 2010. The company was inspired by teledildonics and long-distance relationships.

In 2013, the first app-based sex toys, Max (male masturbator) and Nora (rabbit vibrator), were launched. In 2014, it integrated app controlling.

In 2016, Lush vibrator was launched with the help of S$100,000 raised on the crowdfunding website IndieGogo, and an oscillating G-spot massager. In the same year, it also partnered up with VirtualRealPorn.

In 2017, Lovense released 5 more devices, Hush, Ambi, Domi, Edge, and Osci. In 2018, it introduced USB Bluetooth Adapter to connect its device to an MS-Windows computer.

In 2019, the company upgraded three of its previous devices and relaunched them as Lush 2, Max 2, and Osci 2. In 2020, it launched Domi 2 and limited edition Mission.

In January 2021, the company announced "digital orgies" feature, where up to 100 participants can join via the Lovense app. In early February 2021, Lovense partnered up with CamSoda to launch a vibrating cock ring, Diamo. The ring was also included in an Elden Ring mod. It also launched its small-sized panty vibrator, Ferri, in the same year.

In late 2021, the company launched its "glans massager", called Gush. The massager is compatible with specific integrated games like WildLife Demo. Apart from Gush, 5 more devices were launched, Edge 2, Lush 3, Diamo, Dolce, and Hyphy.

In early 2022, it partnered with SexLikeReal to launch its male vibrator called Calor. It also launched its Sex Machine.

Devices and software
As of 2022, the company has officially released more than 18 devices and software, including Lovense Remote App, Connect App, Cam Extension, and Lovense API. The devices also support a voice assistant, Alexa. The company has integrated cam services to online streamers via its toys that react to tips the streamers receive.

It has also contributed to adult videogames, including 3DXChat, WildLife Demo, and Animal Crossing.

Lovense has widely integrated VR porn and also conducted a 24 hours Twitter Orgy where participants from across the world were able to experience the company's products uniformly.

Awards and recognition
Lovense has been recognized widely in the sex industry and has been reviewed by many critics.

 Forbes Vices Awards 2020 - Disruptive Innovator
 Altporn Awards 2021 from Altporn.net – Best Tech Toy (Lovense Ferri)
 XBIZ Europa Awards 2021 - Sex Toy Product of the Year (Lovense Ferri)
 XBIZ Honors Awards 2022 - International Pleasure Products Company of the Year

References

Sex toy manufacturers
Manufacturing companies of Singapore
Manufacturing companies established in 2010
Singaporean brands
2010 establishments in Singapore
Teledildonics